The 1997 World Mountain Running Championships was the 13th edition of the global mountain running competition, World Mountain Running Championships, organised by the World Mountain Running Association and was held in Male Svatonovice, Czech Republic on 7 September 1997.

Results

Individual

Men individual

Women individual

Team

Men

Women

References

External links
 World Mountain Running Association official web site

World Mountain Running Championships
World Long Distance Mountain Running